Mackay Estate Dairyman's Cottage is a historic home located at East Hills in Nassau County, New York, USA, designed about 1902 by architects Warren and Wetmore in an eclectic style.  It is a -story frame house with a brick first floor set on a rubble base.  It features a steep flaring roof, small dormers with steep roofs, deep projecting eaves, and rows of rectangular windows with flat brackets, giving it a strong Japanese feel.  The house was originally a component of Clarence Mackay's Harbor Hill Estate.

It was listed on the National Register of Historic Places in 1991.  It is one of three remaining buildings listed at that time; the others are the Mackay Estate Gate Lodge and Mackay Estate Water Tower.

References

Houses on the National Register of Historic Places in New York (state)
Houses completed in 1902
Houses in Nassau County, New York
Warren and Wetmore buildings
National Register of Historic Places in Nassau County, New York